Crenella faba, or the Little bean mussel, is a species of bivalve mollusc in the family Mytilidae. It can be found along the north Atlantic coast of North America, ranging from Greenland to Nova Scotia.

References

Mytilidae
Molluscs described in 1776
Taxa named by Otto Friedrich Müller